Sarah Jane Morris (born April 12, 1977) is an American actress. She is best known for her portrayal of Julia Walker on the ABC television drama Brothers & Sisters from 2006 to 2009.

Life and career
Morris was born to Walker (a commercial airline pilot) and Janie Morris, a social worker, the youngest of four siblings, and graduated from the private all-girls' Hutchison School in Memphis. She attended Southern Methodist University (SMU) in Dallas, where she was a member of Kappa Kappa Gamma. It was there that she met her future husband, Ned Brower, whom she married on February 19, 2005. They have a son, Emmett Andrew Brower (born January 24, 2010) and a daughter Beau Katherine (born February 1, 2014).

Morris moved to Los Angeles after college to pursue an acting career and immediately found work on such network television series as Boston Public, Undeclared and Ed. She had a recurring role as Zoe Webb on Felicity from 2001-2002. She later appeared in short-lived drama series Windfall and co-starred in films such as Look and Seven Pounds.

In 2006, Morris was cast as Julia Walker, wife of Tommy Walker (played by Balthazar Getty) in the ABC drama series Brothers & Sisters. She was a regular on the show for the first three seasons and left along with Getty in 2009. In 2011 she was cast as Special Agent Erica Jane Barrett on CBS' NCIS. She also guest-starred in ABC dramas Castle in 2012, and Body of Proof in 2013. In 2013, Morris was cast in A&E drama pilot Occult.

Filmography

Film

Television

References

External links

1977 births
Living people
21st-century American actresses
Actresses from Memphis, Tennessee
American film actresses
American television actresses
Southern Methodist University alumni